The 2017 Alabama A&M Bulldogs football team represented Alabama Agricultural and Mechanical University in the 2017 NCAA Division I FCS football season. The Bulldogs were led by fourth-year head coach James Spady and played their home games at Louis Crews Stadium in Huntsville, Alabama as members of the East Division of the Southwestern Athletic Conference. They finished the season 4–7, 3–4 in SWAC play to finish in third place in the East Division.

Schedule

Source:

References

Alabama AandM
Alabama AandM Bulldogs football team
Alabama A&M Bulldogs football seasons